The Egyptian Second Division A is the second tier of the Egyptian football league system starting from the 2023–24 season, replacing the Egyptian Second Division. It is administered by the Egyptian Football Association. It is below the top professional league in the country, the Egyptian Premier League, and above the newly-created Egyptian Second Division B. It is the first professional second tier league in Egypt.

History
Plans to replace the old Egyptian Second Division with a professional leagues were first revealed by the Egyptian Football Association in 2018, with the purpose of increasing the quality of the league, improving domestic competitions, and also for marketing reasons. It was decided that the 2019–20 season will be that last edition with the old format, with the initial idea of lowering the number of teams participating in the league from 36 to 24 by relegating 15 teams to the Egyptian Third Division, and lowering the number of teams promoting from the lower league from twelve to just three. However, due to the COVID-19 pandemic in Egypt, and the financial difficulties faced by smaller clubs during that period, all clubs that finished in the relegation zones were reprieved from relegation, and the new league plans were halted.

After Gamal Allam was elected for the presidency of the EFA, the idea to change the format of the old second tier surfaced again, and it was decided in early 2022 that the football league system in Egypt will undergo major changes. This was confirmed in August 2022, and it was announced that the second division will be abolished, and two new leagues, known as the Second Division A and Second Division B, will be created as the new second and third tier leagues, respectively. The reformation decision meant that the 2022–23 season will be the last edition of the old second division, which will see just 14 out of the 48 participating teams earning a spot in the first season of the Egyptian Second Division A.

League format
The league will consists of 20 teams in one group. The format is yet to be confirmed by the EFA, but it's expected that the top three will earn promotion to the Egyptian Premier League, while the bottom four will be relegated to the Egyptian Second Division B.

Like other divisions in Egypt, it will take place annually, beginning in September, and ending in June of the following year. The twenty teams play each other twice, home and away, for a total of thirty-eight matches. All teams are eligible to participate in the Egypt Cup, in case they pay the entrance fee.

References 

 
 
3
Egypt
Professional sports leagues
Sports leagues established in 2023
2023 establishments in Egypt